Major James Palmer Huffam VC (31 March 1897 – 16 February 1968) was a Scottish recipient of the Victoria Cross, the highest and most prestigious award for gallantry in the face of the enemy that can be awarded to British and Commonwealth forces.

He was 21 years old, and a second lieutenant in the 5th Battalion, The Duke of Wellington's (West Riding) Regiment, British Army, attd, 2nd Battalion during the First World War. On 31 August 1918 at St. Servin's Farm, France, he performed a deed for which he was awarded the Victoria Cross.

Second Lieutenant Huffam with three men rushed an enemy machine-gun post and put it out of action. His position was then heavily attacked and he withdrew, carrying back a wounded comrade. Again in the night, accompanied by two men only he rushed an enemy machine-gun, capturing eight prisoners and enabling the advance to continue.

After World War I he remained in the army and was for a time seconded to the Royal Air Force as a Flying Officer. He served in the Second World War and achieved the rank of major.

His medal is privately owned and not publicly displayed.

He was born in Dunblane on 31 March 1897. He was the fourth son of Edward Valentine Huffam, an Army Pensioner (Royal Highlanders) and High Bailiff, and Dorothy Roughead Huffam, of 2 West Street, Spittal,
Berwick-on-Tweed. His siblings were Alfred Meek, John Henry, Elizabeth Clara Margery, Dorothy Francis, Henry Harold and Dorothy Gertrude Beatrice. Huffam was educated at Spittal Council School.

He was initiated as a Freemason at St David's Lodge No 393 Berwick on Tweed on 17 Feb 1920, age 22. On 23 April 1935, he married Constance Marion Huffam at Valletta, Malta and they had two children.

After the War, James Palmer Huffam remained in the army undertaking service in India and West Africa. He eventually rose to the rank of Major and retired in 1938 for the first time. During the Second World War he went back into the service and was the Assistant Provost Marshal for France and was involved in the D Day Landings. He retired for the second time in 1945 and died in 1968 at Burnt Oak in Middlesex, on 16 February 1968.

References

Monuments to Courage (David Harvey, 1999)
The Register of the Victoria Cross (This England, 1997)
Scotland's Forgotten Valour (Graham Ross, 1995)

External links
Location of grave and VC medal (Golders Green)
 
 Duke of Wellington's Regiment James Huffam Victoria Cross WW1 Centenary - 1st Sept 2018

British World War I recipients of the Victoria Cross
British Army personnel of World War I
British Army personnel of World War II
Duke of Wellington's Regiment officers
People from Dunblane
1897 births
1968 deaths
British Army recipients of the Victoria Cross